John Corbet II (by 1514–1559), of Sprowston, Norfolk, was an English politician.

He was a Member of Parliament (MP) for Norwich in 1536 and November 1554. He was a brazier in Norwich.

References

1559 deaths
People from Sprowston
English MPs 1536
Year of birth uncertain
English MPs 1554–1555